The Homicide and Serious Crime Command (SCD 1) was an Operational Command Unit of the Metropolitan Police responsible for the investigation of homicide and other serious crimes in London. Most of their work was carried out by Murder Investigation Teams, of which there were 24. It is now known as the Homicide and Major Crime Command and falls within the Met's Frontline Policing directorate.

In addition to the MITs, the Homicide and Serious Crime Command also had five citywide units:

The Central Criminal Court Trials Unit worked with the MITs and Crown Prosecution Service on cases that go to trial at the Central Criminal Court at the Old Bailey. The unit also advocated good practice and procedure through the Policy Unit, Forensic Science Services and the Detective Training Academy.
The Special Projects Investigation Unit reviewed serious crime investigations and conducted primary investigations in certain cases.
The Coroner's Office ensured that investigations Were correctly undertaken within the legal constraints of the powers of the Coroner. Coroner's Officers had a key role as liaison between Operational Command Units, the Coroner's Office and the families of the victims. They also attended the scenes of unexplained deaths to support officers by identifying possible causes of death and advising on scene preservation and the recovery of the deceased.
The HOLMES Support Unit supported police forces nationwide in their use of HOLMES, the Home Office Large Major Enquiry System.
Forensic Review Support staff reviewed current or historical scenes of crime evidence. The unit worked with the Specialist Crime Review Group and Homicide Units and provided advice on forensic evidence recovery including forensic science advances.

References

External links
Homicide and Serious Crime Command official website

Metropolitan Police units